Rocky Fork may refer to:
Rocky Fork (Crooked River), a stream in Missouri
Rocky Fork (Licking River tributary), a stream in Ohio
Rocky Fork, Ohio, an unincorporated community
Rocky Fork State Park (Ohio), in Highland County
Rocky Fork Park Site, an archaeological site in the above park
Rocky Fork State Park (Tennessee), in Unicoi and Greene counties
Rocky Fork, West Virginia, an unincorporated community in Kanawha County